The Sigtuna box is a copper box from Sigtuna, Sweden, which was engraved with a runic inscription in the early 11th century. The box not only tells of trading across the Baltic Sea, it is also engraved with an Old Norse poem in dróttkvætt, the lordly meter which was used when skalds praised lords and kings. The poem talks of thieves being devoured by ravens.

Discovery
The box was discovered in August 1911, when an upholsterer was digging at the bank of lake Mälaren. The finder reported it to have been filled with a heavy substance like coarse wet coffee-grounds, and which was probably made up of small pieces of metal. The substance was kept inside a cloth which quickly disintegrated as soon as he touched it.

Description and use

The thickness of the metal is on average . From top to bottom, it measures .

The box was used by a merchant to keep a small pair of scales for weighing silver and gold. More than 100 similar scales have been found in Birka, Sigtuna's predecessor as emporia, and they were a merchant's insignia, and his most important equipment.

Inscription

Latin transliteration:

 A tiarfr × fik af × simskum × moni × skalaʀ × þis[aʀ] i ...(o)t(i) × in uirmuntr × f(a)þi × runor × þisar
 B fuhl × ualua × slait × (f)aluon × fon kauk × o nos au-a

Old Norse transcription:

 A Diarfʀ fækk af semskum manni skalaʀ þessaʀ i(?) ...[l]andi. En Værmundr faði runaʀ þessaʀ.
 B Fugl vælva slæit falvan: fann gauk a nas au[k]a.

English translation:

 A "Diarfr got from a man from Samland / Semgallen these scales in(?) ...-land. And Vermundr coloured these runes." 
 B "The bird tore apart the pale thief: (One) found (ie observed) the increase (ie from eating) in the corpse-cuckoo (raven)."

Prose part (A)
The first part of the early 11th century inscription contains the merchant's name Diarfr and informs of how he acquired the box and its contents, but it does not give any precise information on from where he got his scales. The adjective semskR is ambiguous and the phrase af semskum manni can both mean that the man came from Sambia and from Zemgale.

Poetry part (B)

The second part of the inscription contains a couplet in the skaldic metre known as dróttkvætt. Here follows Jansson's transcription and translation (1987):

The word velva is in the accusative case and it is probably the same word as the Gothic wilwa ("robber"). Nas gaukR is a kenning for raven which literally means "corpse's cuckoo," and a comparable expression known from Old Icelandic poems is hræva gaukr ("carrion's cuckoo"). The idea that a dead thief should be food for ravens is also in agreement with poetic imagery from the Göksholm runestone and the Rök runestone where ravens and wolves feast on the slain. (For the symbolism of the raven in Viking culture, see the Raven banner.)

Notes

References
Friesen, O. von (1912). Runinskrifterna på en koppardosa funnen i Sigtuna, augusti 1911, in Ekhoff, E. (ed) Fornvännen årgång 7. pp. 6-19.
Jansson, S. B. F. (1987), Runes in Sweden, 
Jesch, J. (2001). Ships and Men in the Late Viking Age: The Vocabulary of Runic Inscriptions and Skaldic Verse. Boydell Press. . 
Rundata 2.0

11th-century inscriptions
1911 archaeological discoveries
Runic inscriptions
Medieval European metalwork objects
Sigtuna Municipality
11th century in Sweden
Containers